Monte Curral is a hill in the city of Espargos, on the island of Sal, Cape Verde. Its elevation is 109 meters. On the summit there is an air control tower for the nearby Amílcar Cabral International Airport, as well as several telecommunication masts.

See also
List of mountains in Cape Verde

References

Mountains of Cape Verde
Curral
Espargos